John Kiriamiti (born 14 February 1950) is a Kenyan former bank robber turned writer. Born in Thuita Village, Kamacharia Location of Murang'a District in Central Kenya, he is the second of the nine children of Albert and Anne Wanjiru Kiriamiti, both primary school teachers in Murang'a.

Background
Kiriamiti is best known as the writer of My Life in Crime and My Life with a Criminal: Milly's Story, which were both a sensation with Kenyan youth in the late 1980s and '90s.

In the years subsequent to his release from Kamiti Maximum Security Prison, he has also become a renowned philanthropist and social reformist rehabilitating street children and thieves in his rural Murang'a home. Besides writing novels, Kiriamiti owns and edits a newspaper, The Sharpener, which he established after the government ban on the Gikuyu version, Inooro, in 1995.

Bibliography
Kiriamiti's books include:
 My Life in Crime – 1980
 My Life with a Criminal: Milly's Story- 1984
 Son of Fate – 1994
 The Sinister Trophy – 2000
 My Life in Prison – 2004
 The Abduction Squad
 City Carjackers

References

1950 births
Bank robbers
Fugitives
Fugitives wanted by Kenya
Living people
Kenyan non-fiction writers